Averaged one-dependence estimators (AODE) is a probabilistic classification learning technique.  It was developed to address the attribute-independence problem of the popular naive Bayes classifier.  It frequently develops substantially more accurate classifiers than naive Bayes at the cost of a modest increase in the amount of computation.

The AODE classifier 

AODE seeks to estimate the probability of each class y given a specified set of features x1, ... xn, P(y | x1, ... xn).  To do so it uses the formula

In recent practice m is usually set at 1.

Derivation of the AODE classifier 

We seek to estimate P(y | x1, ... xn). By the definition of conditional probability

For any ,

Under an assumption that x1, ... xn are independent given y and xi, it follows that

This formula defines a special form of One Dependence Estimator (ODE), a variant of the naive Bayes classifier that makes the above independence assumption that is weaker (and hence potentially less harmful) than the naive Bayes' independence assumption.  In consequence, each ODE should create a less biased estimator than naive Bayes. However, because the base probability estimates are each conditioned by two variables rather than one, they are formed from less data (the training examples that satisfy both variables) and hence are likely to have more variance.  AODE reduces this variance by averaging the estimates of all such ODEs.

Features of the AODE classifier 

Like naive Bayes, AODE does not perform model selection and does not use tuneable parameters. As a result, it has low variance.  It supports incremental learning whereby the classifier can be updated efficiently with information from new examples as they become available.  It predicts class probabilities rather than simply predicting a single class, allowing the user to determine the confidence with which each classification can be made. Its probabilistic model can directly handle situations where some data are missing.

This makes it infeasible for application to high-dimensional data. However, within that limitation, it is linear with respect to the number of training examples and hence can efficiently process large numbers of training examples.

Implementations

The free Weka machine learning suite includes an implementation of AODE.

See also
Cluster-weighted modeling

References

Classification algorithms
Bayesian estimation
Statistical classification